Kuchikau is a village in central Nigeria. It is found in Karu Local Government area of Nasarawa State.

References

Populated places in Nasarawa State